Glaub dran is the only album by the German duo known as Lessmann/Ziller. It was released in 1993 on the label BMG International and featured the reunion of Claus Lessmann and Hans Ziller in musical partnership. The entire album is performed in German. In 2002/2003, Lessmann and Ziller purchased the rights to the material and re-released it under the Bonfire name individually as well as in a box set called The Early Days.

Track listing

Bonus tracks
 Die Antwort weiss der Wind (00:04:24)
 Aus und vorbei [Demo] (00:03:43)
 1001 Nacht [Demo] (00:04:48)
 Dafür lieb' ich dich so sehr [Demo]
 Deutschland [Demo] (00:03:28)
 Kalt wie Eis [Demo] (00:04:03)
 Mama [Demo] (00:04:33)
 Pures Gift [Demo] (00:03:37)
 Sie steht auf Rock'n'Roll [Demo]
 Stell dir mal vor [Demo] (00:03:47)
 Ich will leben [Demo] (00:05:17)
 Für dich [Demo] (00:04:18)
* from the 5-CD box The Early Days of Bonfire (2004)

Personnel
Claus Lessmann – lead and backing vocals, acoustic guitar
Hans Ziller – lead, rhythm and acoustic guitars, backing vocals

References
 Billboard.com - Discography - Claus Lessman/Hans Ziller - Glaub dran

Bonfire (band) albums
1993 albums